The tree skink (Trachylepis planifrons) is a species of skink found in Africa.

References

Trachylepis
Reptiles described in 1878
Taxa named by Wilhelm Peters